Nikolay Afanasyev may refer to:

 Nikolay Afanasyev (athlete) (born 1972), Russian Olympic athlete
 Nikolay Mikhaylovich Afanasyev (1916–2009), Russian firearms designer
 Nikolay Afanasyev (composer) (1820–1898), Imperial Russian violinist and composer